The 2005 Pacific Tri-Nations was the last Pacific Tri-Nations rugby union competition held between Fiji, Samoa, Tonga before the competition was replaced by the Pacific 5 Nations. The tournament ran from 25 June to 30 July and acted as part of the Oceania qualification for the 2007 Rugby World Cup. Samoa won the tournament with Fiji coming second, meaning both qualified for the 2007 Rugby World Cup while Tonga had to enter a repechage.

Table

Results

See also 

2007 Rugby World Cup qualifying
Pacific Tri-Nations

References 

2005
2005 rugby union tournaments for national teams
Fiji national rugby union team matches
Tonga national rugby union team matches
Samoa national rugby union team matches
2005 in Oceanian rugby union
2005 in Fijian rugby union
2005 in Tongan rugby union
2005 in Samoan rugby union